Caboonbah may refer to:
 Caboonbah, Queensland, a locality in the Somerset Region, Queensland, Australia
 Caboonbah Homestead, a former homestead in Lake Wivenhoe, Somerset Region, Queensland, Australia
 Caboonbah Undenominational Church, a church in the Somerset Region, Queensland, Australia